Palaemon capensis is a species of shrimp of the family Palaemonidae. It is endemic to the Eastern Cape province of South Africa, where it lives in both fresh and brackish water.

References

Palaemonidae
Endemic crustaceans of South Africa
Crustaceans described in 1897